Ivor Milsom Yerbury was Archdeacon of Antigua from 1959  until 1967.

Yerbury was  ordained in 1935.  After a curacy in Kingstown he was Priest in charge at Carriacou. Later he held incumbencies in Antigua before his appointment as Archdeacon.

Notes
 

20th-century Anglican priests
Archdeacons of Antigua